Thin Chen Enterprise (full name Sheng Qian Enterprise Co., Ltd), also known as Sachen, was a Taiwanese company that developed several original games for the NES, Mega Drive, Game Boy and other early cartridge-based handheld systems such as the Watara Supervision and Mega Duck. With the exception of the latter two handhelds, all of Thin Chen's games were produced without license from the console manufacturers. The company produced at least 70 unique games for the NES and Famicom and at least 32 for the Game Boy (compiled into eight 4-in-1 cartridges), making it the most prolific unlicensed developer and publisher for both consoles. The company also produced its own Nintendo Entertainment System hardware clones, such as the Q-Boy.

Most of Thin Chen's products were released under the "Sachen" brand name, although the names Joy Van and Commin were also used for certain early games for the Famicom and handheld consoles respectively. Several of their NES games were released outside Taiwan under license by foreign publishers, including: HES Interactive in Australia, Hacker International in Japan (usually with added pornographic content), Bunch Games/Color Dreams and American Video Entertainment in the United States, and Milmar in Brazil.

Developed games

Nintendo Entertainment System/Family Computer

List of titles as Thin Chen

List of titles as Sachen

List of titles as Joy Van
{| class="wikitable sortable"
|-
! scope="col" | #
! scope="col" | Serialnumber
! scope="col" | Title
! scope="col" | AKA title(s) 
! scope="col" | Originalrelease
! scope="col" | Notes
|-
| 1 || TC-001 || Jovial Race || 迷魂車, Míhúnchē || 1989 || 1) Similar to Rally-X.2) Published in Brazil by Milmar.
|-
| 2 || TC-002 || Hidden Chinese Chess || 暗棋 帥 將, Ànqí Shuài Jiāng' || 1989 ||
|-
| 3 || TC-003 || Sidewinder || 1) 響尾蛇, Xiǎngwěishé2) Mission Cobra || 1989 || 
|-
| 4 || TC-004 || Little Red Hood || 小紅帽, Xiǎohóngmào || 1989 || Published in AUS by HES Interactive in 1990.
|-
| 5 || TC-005 || Raid || 1) 突擊, Tūjī2) Silent Assault || 1989 || 
|-
| 6 || TC-006 || Twin Eagle || 双鷹, Shuāng Yīng || 1989 || Published in 1990 by: American Video Entertainment in the U.S., HES Interactive in AUS, and Milmar in Brazil.
|-
| 7 || TC-007 || Master Chu and the Drunkard Hu || 盗帥, Dàoshuài || 1989 || Credited as Master Chu & the Drunkard Hu on title screen.
|-
| 8 || TC-008 || Joyvan Kid || 1) 未来小子, Wèilái Xiǎozi2) Metal Fighter || 1989 || Also known as Space Boy.
|-
| 9 || TC-009 || Incantation || 1) 蝶變, Diébiàn2) Galactic Crusader || 1989 || 
|-
| 10 || TC-010 || Mahjong Trap || 四川麻將, Sìchuān Májiàng || 1989 || 1) Published in Japan by Hacker International as Shisen Mahjong: Seifuku Hen in 1990.2) Contains nudity.
|}

Multi-game cartridges

Note: All series of Super Cartridge Version, was developed and released as Thin Chen Enterprise.

Others
 Mystical Muppet Mahjong [AKA Ti Xian Muou Majiang] — A port of Tel-Tel Mahjong.
 --Unknown-- — A TC-031 numbered series game.

Unreleased
 Bridge Twin BallGame Boy/Game Boy Color

List of titles as Sachen

List of titles as Commin

Multi-game cartridges

Sega Genesis/Mega Drive
Both two games were developed and copyrighted as Thin Chen Enterprise co., as seen on the title screen. However, the name Sachen also appears on the opening screen.

Watara Supervision
All games, both as Thin Chen Enterprise that as Sachen, were all made in 1992 with the only exception of Kung-Fu Street'', which was made in 1993.

Mega Duck
Each Mega Duck/Cougar Boy game is similarly labeled as the same games were marketed for both systems. The notation MDxxx is used for Mega Duck Games, and the notation CBxxx for a Cougar Boy Games. A MD002 is exactly the same game as the CB002, even to a point that some "Cougar Boy" games start up with a Mega Duck logo.

All of the games released for the Mega Duck were subsequently available on the Game Boy.

See also
 Multicart
 Caltron
 NTDEC

References

External links
 Thin Chen Enterprise/Sachen at BootlegGames Wiki.
 Thin Chen Enterprise/Sachen profile on GameFAQs
 A picture of two Sachen multicart games

Video game development companies
Video game publishers
Taiwanese companies established in 1988
Defunct video game companies of Taiwan